Ein Elkorum  is a Syrian village located in Al-Suqaylabiyah Nahiyah in Al-Suqaylabiyah District, Hama.  According to the Syria Central Bureau of Statistics (CBS), Ein Elkorum had a population of 3929 in the 2004 census. Its inhabitants are predominantly Alawites.

References 

Populated places in al-Suqaylabiyah District
Populated places in al-Ghab Plain